Reinhold Remmert (22 June 1930 – 9 March 2016) was a German mathematician. Born in Osnabrück, Lower Saxony, he studied mathematics, mathematical logic and physics in Münster. He established and developed the theory of complex-analytic spaces in joint work with Hans Grauert. Until his retirement in 1995, he was a professor for complex analysis in Münster.

Remmert wrote two books on number theory and complex analysis which contain a huge amount of historical information together with references on important papers in the subject.

See also

Remmert–Stein theorem

Important publications

References 

 
 Short biography hosted at University of Münster
 List of doctoral students

20th-century German mathematicians
1930 births
2016 deaths
Academic staff of the University of Münster
Scientists from Osnabrück
Complex analysts